An episode is a narrative unit within a larger dramatic work or documentary production, such as a series intended for radio, television or streaming consumption. 

The noun episode is derived from the Greek term epeisodion, meaning the material contained between two songs or odes in a Greek tragedy. It is abbreviated as ep (plural eps).

An episode is also a narrative unit within a continuous larger dramatic work. It is frequently used to describe units of television or radio series that are broadcast separately in order to form one longer series. An episode is to a sequence as a chapter is to a book. Modern series episodes typically last 20 to 50 minutes in length.

The noun episode can also refer to a part of a subject, such as an "episode of life" or an "episode of drama".

See also 

 List of most-watched television episodes

References 

Ancient Greek theatre
 
Television terminology